Przecław  is a small town in Mielec County, Subcarpathian Voivodeship, in south-eastern Poland. It is the seat of the gmina (administrative district) called Gmina Przecław. Przecław had the status of a town between the 14th century and 1919, and regained it on 1 January 2010. Its population is 1,775.

History
First known mention of the town of Przecław comes from the year 1419, as earlier documents have not been preserved. Located on the edges of Sandomierz Forest, it was then spelled as Przedzlaw. It is not known when Przecław received its Magdeburg rights town charter, it probably was some time in the 14th century, during the reign of Kazimierz Wielki. The history of Slavic settlement here dates back much earlier. Due to a convenient defensive location, on a hill dominating the valley of the Wisłoka, Przecław was a gord, with a church already existing here in the 12th century. In the Middle Ages, the Wisłoka river bed reached Przecław's eastern boundary, creating a natural protection for both the gord and the church. From the west, it was protected by dense, swampy forests, with numerous rivers, streams and ponds. 

In the late 14th century, the town belonged to Jan Ligęza, and by the mid-15th century, Przecław had a parish school, a mill, a castle, a town hall and a mayor with a council. In 1461, the town had a wójt, belonging to the noble Ligęza family. Przecław was a small town, with only 40 houses (as for 1536). It burned in 1548, and by 1555, a new town hall was built. In 1582, King Stefan Batory allowed the owners of the town to organize two additional fairs a year. Przecław was famous for its blacksmiths, butchers and clothmakers. In the early 17th century, the town had the population of 800, with a number of streets and a stone bridge connecting Przecław with the castle. In 1622, the population was decimated by an epidemic, and on November 25, 1624, half of the buildings burned in a fire (54 houses burned, 47 were saved). The epidemic returned in 1652, and in the Swedish invasion of Poland, Przecław was completely destroyed (1656). By 1660, its population shrank to 116. The town never recovered from the destruction. In 1721, its parish school, founded by Zbigniew Oleśnicki in 1454, was closed.

Until the Partitions of Poland, Przecław belonged to the Sandomierz Voivodeship. From 1772 to 1918, the town was part of Austrian province of Galicia. In 1919, the government of the Second Polish Republic reduced Przecław to the status of a village. In the interwar period, it belonged to Kraków Voivodeship. Przecław regained its town charter on January 1, 2010.

Przecław Palace 
It is not known when the renaissance palace was built. Originally, it was made of wood, and by 1578, belonged to the Ligeza family. In the late 16th century, it was purchased by the Koniecpolski family, which built a new, stone structure. In 1658, the castle was bought by Governor Wladyslaw Rey. The castle remained in the hands of the aristocratic Rey family until its confiscation by the communist regime in 1944. The Rey family had been active during the war in the anti-German underground movement Armia Krajowa and its organisation Tarcza Opieka providing shelter to fugitives, including Jews, and material support to the Polish Resistance. Armia Krajowa members and landowners being persecuted after the war by the communist regime, the Rey family had to go into exile to France. The palace has not been returned to its former owners and is currently a restaurant and a hotel and open to visitors.

See also
 Castles in Poland

References

Cities and towns in Podkarpackie Voivodeship
Mielec County
Lesser Poland
Kingdom of Galicia and Lodomeria
Kraków Voivodeship (1919–1939)